Dmitri Alekseyevich Karasyov (born 1 April 1992) is a Russian former professional football player.

Club career
He made his Russian Premier League debut for FC Volga Nizhny Novgorod on 15 April 2012 in a game against PFC Spartak Nalchik.

References

External links
 

1992 births
Living people
Russian footballers
Association football defenders
Russian Premier League players
FC Volga Nizhny Novgorod players
FC Akhmat Grozny players
FC Nizhny Novgorod (2015) players
FC Sever Murmansk players